Jasmine Rose Wilson (born August 5, 1994), known professionally as Baby Rose, is an American singer born in Washington, D.C. She is an independent artist but has a distribution deal with Human Re Sources.

Early life
Jasmine Rose Wilson was born in  Washington, D.C. and grew up in Fayetteville, North Carolina. At age nine, she got a piano and started recording songs in her adolescent years. Her family realized her talent when she was 12, and started recording songs in the studio.

Musical career
After the release of her mixtape From Dusk 'til Dawn in 2017, Baby Rose has gained attention receiving co-signs from artists such as SZA, Kehlani, and J. Cole. In 2019, she featured on projects like Matt Martian's The Last Party, Big K.R.I.T.'s K.R.I.T. Iz Here, and Dreamville's Revenge of the Dreamers III compilation.

In 2019, she went on the Shea Butter Baby tour with Ari Lennox. She released her debut album on August 22, 2019, titled To Myself.

On May 31, 2020, a remix of her song "Show You" was featured on Episode 8, "Lowkey Happy", of the fourth season of HBO's Insecure.

Discography

Albums

Mixtapes

Guest appearances

References

1994 births
Living people
American women singers
Musicians from Washington, D.C.
21st-century American singers
21st-century American women